The Little People is a 1926 British silent romance film directed by George Pearson and starring Mona Maris, Frank Stanmore and Gerald Ames.

The film's sets were designed by the Brazilian art director Alberto Cavalcanti.

Cast
 Mona Maris as Lucia Morelli  
 Frank Stanmore as Paolo  
 Gerald Ames as Walery  
 Barbara Gott as Sala  
 Harry Farniss as Gian  
 Randle Ayrton as Lyn  
 James Reardon as Manevski

References

Bibliography
 Low, Rachael. The History of the British Film 1918-1929. George Allen & Unwin, 1971.

External links

1926 films
1920s romance films
British romance films
British silent feature films
1920s English-language films
Films directed by George Pearson
Films set in Italy
British black-and-white films
1920s British films